Captain TV is a 24-hour television channel started on 14 April 2010 by Desiya Murpokku Dravida Kazhagam which is a political party in the Indian state of Tamil Nadu.  The managing director of Captain Media is LK Sudhish, brother-in-law of Vijayakanth who is the party's president and a Tamil actor.

Captain TV, a standalone Tamil General Entertainment Satellite Television Channel was launched on 14.4.2010, Equipped with latest technical Infrastructure. It was founded and is owned by Desiya Murpokku Dravida Kazhagam chief captain Vijayakanth

Formerly broadcast

Dubbed soap operas

 Jai Sree krishna
  Mahaveera Hanuman
  Ammuvin cholla Thudikkum Manasu

References

External links

Tamil-language television channels
Television stations in Chennai